Baskerville: A Sherlock Holmes Mystery is a play by American playwright Ken Ludwig. It premiered at the Arena Stage in Southwest, Washington, D.C. in January 2015 and was directed by Amanda Dehnert.

The play is a humorous adaptation of Sir Arthur Conan Doyle's 1902 novel The Hound of the Baskervilles featuring over forty characters played by five actors.

Arena Stage production
Rehearsals were staged at McCarter Theatre Center in Princeton, New Jersey. The play featured two main roles, Sherlock Holmes and Dr. Watson, as well as numerous other roles played by only three other actors. Michael Glenn's roles included Daisy scullery maid, Scotland Yard Inspector Lestrade and Sir Henry Baskerville. Author Ludwig wanted to infuse suspense with humor saying "You’re not making fun of the genre, [but] at the same time, there’s a lot of laughs, because they come out of the tension."

Cast
Gregory Wooddell as Sherlock Holmes
Lucas Hall as Dr. Watson

The other 40-plus roles were performed by three actors: Stanley Bahorek, Michael Glenn and Jane Pfitsch.

Old Globe Theatre production

The play, directed by Josh Rhodes, opened at Old Globe Theatre in San Diego, California on July 30, 2015 and ran through September 6, 2015.

Cast

Euan Morton as Sherlock Holmes
Usman Ally as Dr. Watson

Other roles played by Andrew Kober, Blake Segal and Liz Wisan.

Liverpool Playhouse production

The play, directed by Loveday Ingram,, Liverpool Playhouse, in Liverpool, England on December 9, 2017.

Cast

Jay Taylor as Sherlock Holmes
Patrick Robinson as Dr. Watson

Other roles played by Bessie Carter, Edward Harrison and Ryan Pope.

Park Square Theatre production

In July and August of 2018, Theo Langason directed an adaptation of the play at Park Square Theatre in Saint Paul, Minnesota. It starred McKenna Kelly-Eiding and Marika Proctor as female Holmes and Watson, respectively. All the remaining roles were played by Eric "Pogi" Sumangil, Ricardo Beaird and Marika Proctor.

Lavender Magazine's John Townsend called the production "triumphantly entertaining," citing the actors' comedic timing.

Blooper
Although the opening stage direction to Act One sets the action in the late 1890s, Act 1 Scene 3 has the two main protagonists attending a performance of Puccini's opera Tosca, at Covent Garden. This opera was first performed in Rome on January 14, 1900, and did not receive its London première until July 12, 1900.

References

External links
Baskerville: A Sherlock Holmes Mystery

Plays by Ken Ludwig
2015 plays